The 1913 Arkansas gubernatorial special election took place on July 23, 1913. Acting governor Junius Marion Futrell chose to not seek a term in his own right, but in 1932 he would win a term as governor of Arkansas. Democratic George W. Hays defeated the Republican, Progressive and Socialist candidates Harry H. Myers, George W. Murphy and J. Emil Webber with 64.25% of the vote.

Results

References

1913 Arkansas elections
1913
Arkansas
Arkansas 1913